Heinrich Schwarz was a Prussian politician. Member of Landtag from 1849 to 1852. Official in Lubsza region from 1839 till his death. Highly respected by both Catholic Polish and Protestant German citizens of the region.

References
 Piotr Kalinowski, HEINRICH SCHWARZ - ZAPOMNIANY POLITYK, historycy.pl

Members of the Landtag of Prussia
19th-century German politicians
Year of birth missing
Year of death missing